"A Quiet Game of Cards" was an American television play broadcast on January 29, 1959 as part of the CBS television series, Playhouse 90.  The cast included Barry Sullivan and Franchot Tone.

Plot
A group of wealthy, bored poker buddies decide to commit murder.

Cast
The cast included the following:

 Barry Sullivan as Sturbridge
 Franchot Tone as Raymondd
 Gary Merrill as McBurnie
 E. G. Marshall as Merrill
 William Bendix as Wales
 Irene Hervey as Mrs. McBurnie

Production
The program aired on January 29, 1959, on the CBS television series Playhouse 90. Reginald Rose was the writer and Alex Segal the director.

References

1959 American television episodes
Playhouse 90 (season 3) episodes
1959 television plays